Lansdowne is a rural village on the Mid North Coast near Taree in New South Wales, Australia.

The village lies in the Lansdowne River valley, adjacent to the Coorabakh National Park and the village of Langley Vale, which was served by the Langley Vale Timber Tramway from 1897 to 1933, as well as Coopernook and the Lansdowne State Forests. It is the gateway to the Manning River Valley's northern hinterland Jo.

The first settler of Lansdowne was Benjamin Saville (1814-1896). In 1848 Benjamin purchased 50 acres on the northern bank of the Lansdowne river. The Saville property became the main crossing point for travellers going to and from Port Macquarie for nearly 40 years.

The village and surrounding areas are serviced by a post office and general store, a primary school for children in kindergarten - year 6 and a bowling and recreation club. 

There is an abundance of natural wildlife and fishing is a popular activity for locals. 

At the 2006 census, Lansdowne had a population of 433 people.

The Lansdowne rail station on the North Coast Line was closed in 1975.

References

Mid North Coast
Suburbs of Mid-Coast Council
Towns in New South Wales